Ormiston Chadwick Academy (from 2014, prior to which it was called The Bankfield School) is a coeducational secondary school with academy status, located in Widnes in the English county of Cheshire.

History

Bankfield School
Bankfield School opened in September 1958 as a small secondary modern school, before becoming a comprehensive school in 1974. The numbers on the roll fell, and in the 1980s the school was threatened with closure. In January 1990, following a campaign by the local community, Bankfield became a grant-maintained school. In 1997, the school joined the other schools managed by Halton Borough Council.

In September 2004, Bankfield School was awarded the specialist status Science College and in doing so partnered with the Catalyst Museum and Science Discovery Centre along with 16 industrial sponsors. In 2010, Bankfield became the first school in the Borough of Halton to be judged as 'Outstanding' by Ofsted. The school also gained a second specialism in Applied Learning, and also became a Gifted & Talented Lead School.

Ormiston Chadwick Academy
In April 2013, Ofsted deemed the school to 'require improvement'. This inspection found that standards in the school had significantly slipped. In January 2013, following an October Ofsted report, the school was placed into special measures. Bankfield was then taken over by an interim executive board who aimed to improve the school, and they appointed John Rigby as the interim executive headteacher. On 1 September 2014, the school re-opened as Ormiston Chadwick Academy. The academy is now sponsored by Ormiston Academies Trust and is paired with Ormiston Bolingbroke Academy in Runcorn.

Notable former pupils
Derek Twigg, Labour MP for Halton.

References

External links
Ormiston Chadwick Academy Website
Ormiston Chadwick Academy Twitter

Educational institutions established in 1958
1958 establishments in England
Widnes
Secondary schools in the Borough of Halton
Academies in the Borough of Halton
Ormiston Academies